Phillip Jerome Warner (November 23, 1927 – April 20, 1997) was a farmer and politician in the U.S. state of Nebraska. He served as a state senator from Waverly, Nebraska in the Nebraska Legislature. His father, Charles J. Warner, served in the Nebraska Legislature as well, and also later as Lieutenant Governor of Nebraska.

Personal life
He was born on November 23, 1927, on his parents' farm in Waverly, Nebraska. He was the son of Nebraska State Senator Charles J. Warner, the first Speaker of the Nebraska Unicameral Legislature. He graduated from Waverly High School and then went on to the University of Nebraska-Lincoln where he received a Bachelor of Science degree in Agriculture after playing for the Nebraska Cornhuskers Football Team. Warner later married Betty Pearson in 1952, a former newspaper political reporter. He was a lifelong farmer who enjoyed farming and raising Hereford cattle on the family farm outside of Waverly, Nebraska.

In 1994, his wife Betty died of cancer. Warner would pass away three years later in 1997 at the age of 69. After his wife's death, the eastern segment of Nebraska Highway 2 from Lincoln to Nebraska City was named the Jerome and Betty Warner Highway.

State legislature
He was elected to the legislature in 1962 to represent the 25th Nebraska legislative district after a failed bid for the office in 1960. He was consistently reelected until his death in 1997. During his 35 years of service to the Nebraska Legislature, Warner  headed committees on Education, Appropriations and Revenue, chaired  the Government and Military Affairs Committee and the Legislature's Executive Board, as well as serving as the Speaker from 1969 to 1970. He was greatly respected by his colleagues and was referred to as the "Dean of the Legislature."

Over the years, Warner introduced and influenced bills aimed at reducing the state's dependence on property taxes, providing state aid to schools, encouraging school consolidation, creating the Department of Administrative Services, establishing a state highway classification system and formula for disbursement of funds to local governments, changing the state budget cycle from an annual to a biennial system, and making Kearney State College a part of the University of Nebraska system. Warner was a large supporter and friend of the University of Nebraska and passionately defended it against budget cuts.

A biography of Jermoe Warner was written by Charlyne Berends called Leaving your mark: The political career of Nebraska State Senator Jerome Warner in 1997.

See also

 Nebraska Legislature
 List of speakers of the Nebraska Legislature
 Charles J. Warner

References

1927 births
1997 deaths
People from Lancaster County, Nebraska
University of Nebraska–Lincoln alumni
Farmers from Nebraska
Republican Party Nebraska state senators
Speakers of the Nebraska Legislature
20th-century American politicians